This is a list of tumblers, minor planets, comets and natural satellites whose angular momentum vector is far from the principal axis of inertia, so that they do not rotate in a fairly constant manner with a constant period. Instead of rotating around a constant axis or around a wobbling axis, they appear to tumble (see Poinsot's ellipsoid for an explanation). For true tumbling, the three moments of inertia must be different. If two are equal, then the axis of rotation will simply precess in a circle. As of 2018, there are 3 natural satellites and 198 confirmed or likely tumblers out of a total of nearly 800,000 discovered small Solar System bodies. The data is sourced from the "Lightcurve Data Base" (LCDB). The tumbling of a body can be caused by the torque from asymmetrically emitted radiation known as the YORP effect.

Note that the rotation periods given below are approximate. The rotation period is not constant for a tumbler.

Natural satellites 

This is a list of tumbling natural satellites (moons) that orbit planets and dwarf planets in the Solar System.

Minor planets and comets

Notes

References

See also 
 List of slow rotators (minor planets)
 List of fast rotators (minor planets)

External links 
 Those Tumbling Asteroids, The Messenger (1976), ESA 
 Asteroid Lightcurve Database (LCDB), query form (info)
 JPL Small-Body Database Browser

Tumblers (small Solar System bodies)
tumblers